Harrison County is a county located in the northwest portion of the U.S. state of Missouri. As of the 2020 census, the population was 8,157. It's county seat is Bethany. The county was organized February 14, 1845 and named for U.S. Representative Albert G. Harrison of Missouri.

Geography

Adjacent counties
Ringgold County, Iowa (north)
Decatur County, Iowa (northeast)
Mercer County (east)
Grundy County (southeast)
Daviess County (south)
Gentry County (southwest)
Worth County (northwest)

Major highways
 Interstate 35
 U.S. Route 69
 U.S. Route 136
 Route 13
 Route 46
 Route 146

Demographics

As of the 2010 census, there were 8,957 people, 3,669 households and 2,461 families residing in the county.  The population density was 12 people per square mile (5/km2).  There were 4,407 housing units at an average density of 6 per square mile (2/km2).  The racial makeup of the county was 97.55% White, 0.36% Native American, 0.33% Black or African American, 0.20% Asian, 0.10% Pacific Islander, 0.52% from other races and 0.93% from two or more races. Approximately 1.57% of the population were Hispanic or Latino of any race.

There were 3,669 households, out of which 29.79% had children under the age of 18 living with them, 54.51% were married couples living together, 8.29% had a female householder with no husband present and 32.92% were non-families. 28.26% of all households were made up of individuals, and 14.31% had someone living alone who was 65 years of age or older.  The average household size was 2.40 and the average family size was 2.93.

In the county, the population was spread out, with 24.80% under the age of 18, 7.18% from 18 to 24, 20.88% from 25 to 44, 26.44% from 45 to 64 and 20.70% who were 65 years of age or older.  The median age was 42.6 years. For every 100 females there were 98.47 males.  For every 100 females age 18 and over, there were 93.79 males.

The median income for a household in the county was $35,000 and the median income for a family was $47,788. Males had a median income of $33,105 versus $25,388 for females. The per capita income for the county was $18,967.  About 10.3% of families and 15.1% of the population were below the poverty line, including 18.9% of those under age 18 and 13.8% of those age 65 or over.

Religion
According to the Association of Religion Data Archives County Membership Report (2010), evangelical Protestantism is the most common religion among adherents in Harrison County, although 37.69% of the population does not claim any religion. The most predominant denominations among residents in Harrison County who adhere to a religion are Southern Baptists (44.11%), United Methodists (10.77%) and Disciples of Christ (10.76%).

2020 Census

Education

Public schools
Cainsville R-I School District - Cainsville
Cainsville Elementary School (PK-06)
Cainsville High School (07-12)
Gilman City R-IV School District - Gilman City
Gilman City Elementary School (PK-06)
Gilman City High School (07-12)
North Harrison County R-III School District - Eagleville
North Harrison County Elementary School (PK-05)
North Harrison County High School (06-12)
Ridgeway R-V School District - Ridgeway
Ridgeway Elementary School (PK-06)
Ridgeway High School (07-12)
South Harrison County R-II School District - Bethany
South Harrison County Early Childhood Educational Center (PK)
South Harrison County Elementary School (K-06)
South Harrison County High School (07-12)

Private schools
Zadie Creek School - Eagleville (02-09) - Amish

Public libraries
Bethany Public Library

Politics

Local
The Republican Party controls politics at the local level in Harrison County. Republicans hold all of the elected positions in the county.

State

All of Harrison County is a part of Missouri's 2nd District in the Missouri House of Representatives and is currently represented by J. Eggleston (R-Maysville). Eggleston was reelected to a fourth term in 2020.

All of Harrison County is a part of Missouri's 12th District in the Missouri Senate and is currently represented by Dan Hegeman (R-Cosby). Hegeman won a second term in 2018.

Federal
All of Harrison County is included in Missouri's 6th Congressional District and is currently represented by Sam Graves (R-Tarkio) in the U.S. House of Representatives. Graves was elected to an eleventh term in 2020 over Democratic challenger Gena Ross.

Harrison County, along with the rest of the state of Missouri, is represented in the U.S. Senate by Josh Hawley (R-Columbia) and Roy Blunt (R-Strafford).

Blunt was elected to a second term in 2016 over then-Missouri Secretary of State Jason Kander.

Political culture

At the presidential level, Harrison County is reliably Republican. Donald Trump carried the county easily in 2016 and 2020. Bill Clinton was the last Democratic presidential nominee to carry Harrison County in 1992. The last Democrat to win support from a majority of Harrison County voters was Lyndon Johnson in 1964.

Like most rural areas throughout northwest Missouri, voters in Harrison County generally adhere to socially and culturally conservative principles which tend to influence their Republican leanings. In 2004, Missourians voted on a constitutional amendment to define marriage as the union between a man and a woman—it overwhelmingly won in Harrison County with 81% of the vote. The initiative passed the state with 71% support from voters. In 2006, Missourians voted on a constitutional amendment to fund and legalize embryonic stem cell research in the state—it failed in Harrison County with 56% voting against the measure. The initiative narrowly passed the state with 51% of support from voters as Missouri became one of the first states in the nation to approve embryonic stem cell research. Despite Harrison County's longstanding tradition of supporting socially conservative platforms, voters in the county have a penchant for advancing populist causes like increasing the minimum wage. In 2006, Missourians voted on a proposition (Proposition B) to increase the minimum wage in the state to $6.50 an hour—it passed Harrison County with 61% of the vote. The proposition strongly passed every single county in Missouri with 79% voting in favor. (During the same election, voters in five other states also strongly approved increases in the minimum wage.) In 2018, Missourians voted on a proposition (Proposition A) concerning right to work, the outcome of which ultimately reversed the right to work legislation passed in the state the previous year. 59.09% of Harrison County voters cast their ballots to overturn the law.

Missouri presidential preference primaries

2020
The 2020 presidential primaries for both the Democratic and Republican parties were held in Missouri on March 10. On the Democratic side, former Vice President Joe Biden (D-Delaware) both won statewide and carried Harrison County by a wide margin. Biden went on to defeat President Donald Trump in the general election.

Incumbent President Donald Trump (R-Florida) won both Harrison County and statewide by large margins. None of his primary challengers received any votes in Harrison County.

2016
The 2016 presidential primaries for both the Republican and Democratic parties were held in Missouri on March 15. Businessman Donald Trump (R-New York) narrowly won the state overall and won a plurality of the vote in Harrison County. He went on to win the presidency.

On the Democratic side, former Secretary of State Hillary Clinton (D-New York) won statewide by a small margin, but Senator Bernie Sanders (I-Vermont) narrowly carried Harrison County.

2012
In the 2012 Missouri Republican Presidential Primary, voters in Harrison County supported former U.S. Senator Rick Santorum (R-Pennsylvania), who finished first in the state at large, but ultimately lost the nomination to former Governor Mitt Romney (R-Massachusetts). Delegates were chosen at a county caucus that ultimately selected an uncommitted delegation. Incumbent President Barack Obama easily won the Missouri Democratic Primary and renomination. He defeated Romney in the general election.

2008
In 2008, the Missouri Republican Presidential Primary was closely contested, with Senator John McCain (R-Arizona) prevailing and eventually winning the nomination.

Then-Senator Hillary Clinton (D-New York) received more votes than any candidate from either party in Harrison County during the 2008 presidential primary. Despite initial reports that Clinton had won Missouri, Barack Obama (D-Illinois), also a Senator at the time, narrowly defeated her statewide and later became that year's Democratic nominee, going on to win the presidency.

Communities

Cities
Bethany (county seat)
Cainsville
Gilman City
New Hampton
Ridgeway

Villages
Blythedale
Eagleville
Mount Moriah

Unincorporated communities

 Akron
 Andover
 Blue Ridge
 Bolton
 Brooklyn
 Hatfield
 Martinsville
 Matkins
 Melbourne
 Mitchellville
  Pawnee
 Pleasant Ridge
 Washington Center

Townships
Source

Adams
Bethany
Butler
Clay
Colfax
Cypress
Dallas
Fox Creek
Grant
Hamilton
Jefferson
Lincoln
Madison
Marion
Sherman
Sugar Creek
Trail Creek
Union
Washington
White Oak

Notable people
Babe Adams - MLB pitcher (1906-1926)
Leonard Boswell - Politician
Frank Buckles - Last surviving American veteran of World War I
Jesse N. Funk - World War I Medal of Honor recipient
Tyler Luellen - University of Missouri Football 2003-2007

See also
National Register of Historic Places listings in Harrison County, Missouri

References

Further reading
 Wanamaker, George W. History of Harrison County, Missouri (1921) online

External links
 Digitized 1930 Plat Book of Harrison County  from University of Missouri Division of Special Collections, Archives, and Rare Books
 Harrison County Sheriff's Office

 
Missouri counties
1845 establishments in Missouri
Populated places established in 1845